William the Fourth was a 54-ton wooden paddle steamer built by Marshall & Lowe, Erringhi (now Clarence Town), New South Wales, Australia. She was the first oceangoing steamship built in Australia when launched in 1831. She was rebuilt and lengthened in 1853. She plied the East Coast of New South Wales until 1863, when she sailed to China and was sold and operated on the Shanghai–Ningpo route. Records end in 1868 when she sailed to Japan.

Replica
A replica was built at Raymond Terrace from 1985 to 1987 as part of the Australian Bicentenary and was launched by Hazel Hawke on 26 September 1987.

References

1831 ships
Ships built in New South Wales
Paddle steamers of Australia